Erase the Pain is the fourth studio album by American post-hardcore band Palisades. The album was released on December 28, 2018, by Rise Records. It peaked at number 175 on the Billboard 200, number 1 on the Heatseekers chart, number 9 on the Hard Rock Albums chart, and number 1 on the Independent Albums chart. It is their last release to feature Louis Miceli Jr. on lead vocals, since he left the band on December 1, 2021.

Track listing

Personnel
Palisades
 Louis Miceli – lead vocals, unclean vocals
 Xavier Adames – lead guitar, backing vocals
 Matthew Marshall – rhythm guitar
 Brandon Elgar – bass guitar, backing vocals, co-lead vocals
 Aaron Rosa – drums, percussion
 Christian "DJ" Graves" Mochizuki – turntables, sampling, keyboards, synthesizers, programming

Production
 Howard Benson – producer

Charts

References

2017 albums
Palisades (band) albums
Rise Records albums